Johannes "Johs" Rian (17 May 1891 – 10 December 1981) was a Norwegian painter.

Johs Rian was born in Overhalla in Nord-Trøndelag, Norway. He was a son of farmers Peter Rian (1856–1934) and Elen Blengslien (1864–1952). He also worked at the family farm, but left this career in 1927 to pursue painting. He studied at the Norwegian National Academy of Fine Arts from 1928 to 1930 under Axel Revold. He was also inspired by Henrik Sørensen, and Revold's teacher Henri Matisse. In 1936 he married his secretary Ellen Gjønnæs (1903–1961). In 1950, Rian was provided with a Thomas Fearnley Memorial Scholarship and traveled to the south of France.

Rian exhibited at the contemporary art gallery Kunstnerforbundet in Oslo several times between 1930 and 1957, and also at the São Paulo Biennal in 1967/68. From 1960 he mainly exhibited at Galleri Haaken in Oslo. He also started painting nonfigurative art. The Norwegian Museum of Contemporary Art owns eight of his paintings. He was decorated with the Royal Norwegian Order of St. Olav in 1978 and died in 1981 at Oslo.

Selected works

 Pike med katt, 1932
 Lekselesing, 1946 
 Dame med sort katt, 1946
 Côte d'Azur, 1950
 Rødt interiør, 1950
 Damen med celloen, 1950
 Blått atelier, 1953
 Nonnespeilet, 1961
 Dekorasjon, 1966
 Former på blå bunn, 1967

References

1891 births
1981 deaths
People from Overhalla
Oslo National Academy of the Arts alumni
20th-century Norwegian painters
Norwegian male painters
20th-century Norwegian male artists